Ramachandrapuram (Bhel Township) is a census town in Medak district in the Indian state of Telangana.

Demographics
 India census, Ramachandrapuram had a population of 16,965. Males constitute 51% of the population and females 49%. Ramachandrapuram has an average literacy rate of 84%, higher than the national average of 59.5%: male literacy is 90%, and female literacy is 79%. In Ramachandrapuram, 7% of the population is under 6 years of age. Their pin code is 502032.....

References

Towns in Medak district
Townships in India
502032